Ronnie Free (born Ronald Guy Free on January 15, 1936, in Charleston, South Carolina) is an American jazz drummer. His recording credits date back to the 1950s and he has collaborated with many notable jazz musicians including pianists Mose Allison, Oscar Pettiford, Sonny Clark, and bandleader Woody Herman.
The story of Ronnie Free's time in New York is told in an episode of NPR's "The Jazz Loft" series and as a resident of the loft Free functioned as the "house drummer" for many of the jam sessions that occurred there.

Discography

With Mose Allison
Ramblin' with Mose (Prestige, 1958)
Creek Bank (Prestige, 1958)
Autumn Song (Prestige, 1959)
With Lee Konitz and Jimmy Guiffre
Lee Konitz Meets Jimmy Giuffre (Verve, 1959)

External links 
What Happened to Ronnie Free?
The Jazz Lesson ....... By Alan Freeman
Ron Free interview on "The Story" from WUNC

American session musicians
Musicians from Charleston, South Carolina
1936 births
Living people
20th-century American drummers
American male drummers
20th-century American male musicians